Jennifer Anne Ehle (born December 29, 1969) is an American actress. She gained fame for her role as Elizabeth Bennet in the 1995 BBC miniseries Pride and Prejudice, for which she received the BAFTA TV Award for Best Actress. She is also known for her performances on Broadway, winning the Tony Award for Best Actress in a Play for The Real Thing in 2000, and Tony Award for Best Featured Actress in a Play for The Coast of Utopia in 2007.

Ehle also is known for her performances in films including The King's Speech (2010), Contagion (2011), Zero Dark Thirty (2012), A Little Chaos (2014), Little Men (2016), and She Said (2022). She has also appeared in various television programs, including NBC's The Blacklist (2014-2015), the Hulu limited series The Looming Tower (2016), the Showtime miniseries The Comey Rule (2020), and the CBS legal drama The Good Fight (2022).

Early life and education
Ehle was born in Winston-Salem, North Carolina, to English actress Rosemary Harris and American author John Ehle. Her ancestry includes Romanian (from a maternal great-grandmother) and, paternally, German and English.

Ehle appeared as a toddler in a 1973 Broadway revival of A Streetcar Named Desire, in which her mother played Blanche DuBois. She spent her childhood in both the UK and the US, attending several different schools including Interlochen Arts Academy. She was raised largely in Asheville, North Carolina. Her drama training was split between the North Carolina School of the Arts and the Central School of Speech and Drama in London.

Career

1990s 
Ehle made her West End debut as Elmire in the 1991 Peter Hall Company production of Tartuffe, for which she won second prize at the Ian Charleson Awards. Hall then cast her as Calypso in The Camomile Lawn (1992), a television adaptation of Mary Wesley's book of the same name, in which she and her mother played the same character at different ages. 

One of Ehle's first notable roles was as Elizabeth Bennet in the BBC 1995 television adaptation of Jane Austen's Pride and Prejudice co-starring Colin Firth, for which she won the British Academy Television Award for Best Actress. The same year, she joined the Royal Shakespeare Company, and gained her first major feature film role in Paradise Road (1997). She also appeared in supporting roles in Brian Gilbert's Wilde (1997) and István Szabó's Sunshine (1999).

2000s 
In 2000, Ehle made her Broadway debut to great critical acclaim as Annie in Tom Stoppard's The Real Thing, winning the Tony Award for Best Performance by a Leading Actress in a Play. Her mother, Rosemary Harris, was also nominated for the same award that year for Waiting in the Wings. That following year, Ehle appeared again on Broadway in the revival of Noël Coward's Design for Living co-starring with Dominic West and Alan Cumming.

After a hiatus, Ehle returned to the London stage in 2005 in The Philadelphia Story at the Old Vic opposite Kevin Spacey. The following year, she played Lady Macbeth in Macbeth with Liev Schreiber, as part of the Shakespeare in the Park.

Ehle returned to Broadway portraying three characters in Stoppard's The Coast of Utopia triptych, which ran from October 2006 until May 2007. Ehle starred alongside Billy Crudup, Martha Plimpton, and Ethan Hawke. Theatre critic Ben Brantley of The New York Times praised her performance as "memorable". For her performance she received her second Tony Award for Best Featured Actress in a Play.

In August 2009, it was announced that Ehle would play the character of Catelyn Stark in the pilot of HBO's Game of Thrones, an adaptation of George R.R. Martin's A Song of Ice and Fire fantasy book series. Ehle filmed the pilot episode, but decided it was too soon to return to work after the birth of her daughter. She was replaced by Northern Irish actress Michelle Fairley.

2010s 
In 2010, Ehle starred alongside John Lithgow in the production of Mr. & Mrs. Fitch presented by Second Stage Theatre in New York City. Since 2010, Ehle has appeared in the critically acclaimed films The King's Speech (where she reunited with her Pride and Prejudice co-star Colin Firth), Steven Soderbergh's Contagion (2011), George Clooney's The Ides of March (2011), Kathryn Bigelow's Zero Dark Thirty (2012), Alan Rickman's A Little Chaos (2015), Terence Davies's A Quiet Passion (2016), and Ira Sachs's Little Men (2016). 

Television credits include A Gifted Man (2011–2012) and The Looming Tower (2018).

In 2017, Ehle appeared on stage in the critically acclaimed Oslo, which won the Tony Award for Best Play. She herself was nominated for Best Actress in a Play for her work. In 2018, she appeared in the Hulu limited series, The Looming Tower as Ambassador Barbara Bodine. The series also starred Jeff Daniels, Bill Camp, Peter Sarsgaard, and Michael Stuhlbarg.

2020s 
In 2020, Ehle reunited with Jeff Daniels in the limited series The Comey Rule which premiered on Showtime. Daniels and Ehle portrayed Former FBI Director James Comey and his wife Patrice, respectively. In 2022 she also appeared in a variety of television projects including the Apple TV+ series Suspicion as Amy, the Showtime legal drama The Good Fight as Judge Ashley Burnett and the Paramount+ western series 1923 as Sister Mary. 

Also in 2022, Ehle received positive reviews for her supporting yet essential role in the Metoo investigative drama She Said portraying Laura Madden. TIME film critic Stephanie Zacharek described her as "superb" and Justin Chang writing for NPR declared her performance as "quietly heartbreaking". She also returned the stage as Gertrude in the Park Avenue Armory production of Hamlet in New York. Ehle received positive reviews as a last minute replacement for Lia Williams.

Personal life
Ehle married writer Michael Ryan on November 29, 2001, and they have two children.

Filmography

Film

Television

Theatre

Awards and nominations

Tony Awards

BAFTA Awards

Screen Actors Guild Award

Laurence Olivier Award

Outer Critics Circle Award

Other award wins:
 1991: Ian Charleson Award, Second Prize – as Orgon's wife in Tartuffe with the Peter Hall Company
 1992: Radio Times Award Best Newcomer – The Camomile Lawn (TV)
 2000: Variety Club Award – The Real Thing (play)

Other award nominations:
 2000: Genie Award nomination – Sunshine

References

External links
 

1969 births
20th-century American actresses
21st-century American actresses
Alumni of the Royal Central School of Speech and Drama
American film actresses
American people of English descent
American people of German descent
American people of Romanian descent
American stage actresses
American television actresses
Best Actress BAFTA Award (television) winners
Living people
Outstanding Performance by a Cast in a Motion Picture Screen Actors Guild Award winners
Actresses from Winston-Salem, North Carolina
Theatre World Award winners
Tony Award winners
Actresses from North Carolina
People from Asheville, North Carolina
American expatriates in England
American Shakespearean actresses
Alumni of the British American Drama Academy
Royal Shakespeare Company members
Audiobook narrators